McGirk is an unincorporated community in eastern Moniteau County, Missouri, United States. It is located approximately five miles east of California on old U.S. Route 50.

A post office called McGirk has been in operation since 1881. The community has the name of the local McGirk family.

References

Unincorporated communities in Moniteau County, Missouri
Jefferson City metropolitan area
Unincorporated communities in Missouri